Ivo Perilli (10 April 1902 – 24 November 1994) was an Italian screenwriter. He wrote for more than 50 films between 1933 and 1977.

Selected filmography

 Figaro and His Great Day (1931)
 Lowered Sails (1931)
 La Wally (1932)
 Ragazzo (1934)
 Red Passport (1935)
 Like the Leaves (1935)
 Ginevra degli Almieri (1935)
 The Dance of Time (1936)
 The Amnesiac (1936)
 I'll Give a Million (1936)
 Luciano Serra, Pilot (1938)
 The Count of Brechard (1938)
 Mad Animals (1939)
 Heartbeat (1939)
 The Document (1939)
 I, His Father (1939)
 Department Store (1939)
 The Faceless Voice (1939)
 A Romantic Adventure (1940)
 The Betrothed (1941)
 The Captain's Daughter (1947)
 Prelude to Madness (1948)
 The Wolf of the Sila (1949)
 The Ungrateful Heart (1951)
 Anna (1951)
 Europa '51 (1952)
 The Blind Woman of Sorrento (1952)
 Le infedeli (1953)
 Ulysses (1954)
 The Miller's Beautiful Wife (1955)
 Sunset in Naples (1955)
 War and Peace (1956)
 The Courier of Moncenisio (1956)

References

External links

1902 births
1994 deaths
20th-century Italian screenwriters
Italian male screenwriters
Writers from Rome
20th-century Italian male writers